The sruti upanga ("drone bagpipe", or bhazana-śruti, druthi, or nosbug) is a type of bagpipe played in Tamil Nadu, southern India.  The instrument was often used to supply a drone to accompany mukha vina (Tamil oboe) music.

The instrument was described by Charles Russel Day (1860-1900):

Playing method
Beatrice Edgerly notes in 1942, similar to Day, that the pitch of the instrument was controlled by inserting wire or bits of silk.

See also

Mashak, a Northern Indian bagpipe
Titti (bagpipe), a bagpipe in Andhra Pradesh and Kerala

References

External links
Online Shruti Box Free Online Shruti box.

Bagpipes
Indian musical instruments